This article lists census-designated places (CDPs) in the U.S. state of Texas. As of 2020 Census, there were a total of 637 census-designated places in Texas.

Census-Designated Places

See also 

List of counties in Texas
List of municipalities in Texas
List of unincorporated communities in Texas
List of ghost towns in Texas
Administrative divisions of Texas

References 

 
Census-designated places
Texas